Allfather or All-father may refer to:

 Allfather, or Alföðr, a name of Odin, a central god in Germanic paganism
 Allfather D'Aronique, a fictional character from Preacher
 The Dagda, known as all-father, an important god in Irish mythology

See also
God the Father
King of the Gods
Creator deity
 Sky father
 El (deity)
 Zeus
 Jupiter (mythology)